The Webster Graduate School was a campus of Webster University in London, England, whose main campus is in St Louis, Missouri, USA.

Webster Graduate School was based in the Regent's University London campus at Regent's Park in central London. The school offers full-time and part-time MBA courses, and a taught Master's portfolio including Marketing, Finance, International Relations, Human Resources, Management and Leadership.

Academics
In its student guidelines, the school advises a B-grade or better. Failing to reach this standard will result in the student being dismissed. 

Students of the MA International Relations were eligible for membership of the Royal Institute for International Affairs, Chatham House.

Webster Network 
Webster Graduate School London was part of the International Webster University network. The London campus was generally regarded as the hub of the network.

External links 
 Webster Graduate School, London 
 Webster University Worldwide

Webster University
Regent's University London